Pedicle or pedicel may refer to:

Human anatomy
Pedicle of vertebral arch, the segment between the transverse process and the vertebral body, and is often used as a radiographic marker and entry point in vertebroplasty and kyphoplasty procedures
Pedicle of a skin flap (medicine)
Hilum of kidney, also called the renal pedicle
Pedicel, a foot process of a renal podocyte

Animal anatomy
 Pedicle in brachiopods, a fleshy line used to attach and anchor brachiopods and some bivalve mollusks to a substrate
Pedicle (cervidae), the attachment point for antlers in cervids
 Pedicel (antenna), the second segment of the antenna in the class Insecta, where the Johnston's organ is found
 Pedicel or petiole (insect), the stem formed by a restricted abdominal segment which connects the thorax with the gaster (the remaining abdominal segments) in the suborder Apocrita
 Pedicel (spider), the narrow segment connecting the cephalothorax with the abdomen

Other
Pedicel (botany), the stalk of an individual flower
Congo Pedicle, an area of DR Congo jutting into Zambia
 Zaire Pedicle, used for 'Congo Pedicle' during the time that DR Congo was called Zaire
Congo Pedicle road, serving Zambian provinces either side of the Congo Pedicle